Argentium™ silver (patented in 1998) is a brand of modern tarnish-resistant silver alloys, containing either 93.5% or 96% silver. Argentium alloys replace some of the copper in the traditional sterling silver (92.5% silver + 7.5% copper) with the metalloid germanium.
Both argentium 935 and argentium 960 alloys exceed the standard required for hallmarking as sterling silver, and argentium 960 silver meets the standard for hallmarking as Britannia silver (95.84% silver).

Origins and description
Argentium silver is the result of research at the Art and Design Research Institute (ADRI), School of Art & Design, Middlesex University, by Peter Johns and colleagues. The project began in 1990 with research on the effects of germanium additions to silver alloys. Germanium was discovered to impart the following properties to sterling silver:
 firescale elimination
 high tarnish resistance
 precipitation hardening and simple heat-hardening properties
 increased ductility
 increased thermal and electrical resistance
 environmental advantages

Many of these properties significantly affect the traditional methods of working silver. For instance the absence of firescale eliminates tedious and time-consuming steps required by the silver worker using traditional sterling silver. It also eliminates the need for plating the final product which is often done on manufactured items because of the problems introduced by firescale. Tarnish resistance is of significant importance to both silver workers and the wearer of silver jewellery.

Argentium silver was patented and is trademarked by Argentium Silver Company, UK.

Physical properties

{| class="wikitable";
|+ 
!rowspan=2| Silveralloy
!colspan=2| Solidusmelting temperature 
!colspan=2| Liquidusflow point temperature 
|- style="text-align:center;"
| °C || °F || °C || °F
|- style="text-align:right;"
|   ||  802°C || 1475°F  ||  899°C || 1650°F
|- style="text-align:right;"
|   ||  803°C || 1477°F   ||  903°C || 1657°F
|- style="text-align:right;"
|   ||  905°C || 1661°F   ||  925°C || 1697°F
|}

Footnotes

References

Further reading

External links
 
 

Silver
Precious metal alloys
Jewellery making